The Ford Five Hundred is a full-size automobile that was manufactured and marketed by Ford from 2004 to 2007, and debuted as a 2005 model year vehicle. Deriving its nameplate from the ''500" suffix used by Ford on the Custom 500, Fairlane 500 and Galaxie 500 model ranges from the 1950s to 1970s, the Five Hundred was the larger of two model lines intended to replace the Ford Taurus (the Ford Fusion being the smaller vehicle). Within the Ford model line, the Five Hundred was slotted between the Fusion and Crown Victoria.

Marking the debut of the Ford D3 platform, the Five Hundred marked several firsts for full-size Ford vehicles, introducing front-wheel drive, all-wheel drive (as an option), unibody construction, and the first generation sold without a V8 engine (since the Ford Model A). Along with the first completely new full-size chassis since 1979, the 2005 Five Hundred introduced two distinct full-size model lines to Ford (for the first time since the 1978 discontinuation of the Custom 500).

The Five Hundred was produced exclusively as a four-door sedan, with the role of the Ford Taurus station wagon adopted by the Ford Freestyle (marketed as a CUV by Ford). The Five Hundred was marketed by Lincoln-Mercury under the revived Mercury Montego nameplate, slotted between the Mercury Milan and Mercury Grand Marquis. For the 2008 model year, for a mid-cycle revision, the Five Hundred was re-christened as the Ford Taurus; the Freestyle became the Taurus X, with the Mercury Montego renamed the Mercury Sable. Outside of North America and South Korea, the Five Hundred name remained in use through 2009.

The Five Hundred was assembled by Ford at its Chicago Assembly facility (Chicago, Illinois) alongside the Freestyle and Montego. Excluding export sales, 241,402 Ford Five Hundreds were produced.

Background 

As part of the 1999 acquisition of Volvo Cars and its addition to Premier Automotive Group, Ford Motor Company expanded on its vehicle safety technology capabilities and began development of a D186 Taurus replacement. In 2000, the Ford Prodigy concept car was shown. A 72MPG diesel-electric hybrid designed as part of the Partnership for a New Generation of Vehicles, the Prodigy would introduce much of the exterior styling of the Five Hundred; it was also the first Ford to use the horizontal "three-bar" grille (which made its production debut on the 2006 Ford Fusion).

The Ford Five Hundred entered production on July 12, 2004 at Chicago Assembly (the previous assembly site of the Ford Taurus), and became available to the public in September 2004.

Total Vehicle Geometry 
The Ford Five Hundred/Mercury Montego were engineered with a quality control system named Total Vehicle Geometry (TVG). Designed by Volvo, TVG is heavily computer-based, allowing for designers, engineers, and suppliers access for all data and results related to prototypes at all stages of the design process. With improved participation and access, fit and finish increased on prototype parts, decreasing the time needed for preliminary production vehicles, so called pilot vehicles.

Overview 

Noted for its simple, straight-forward styling, large interior cabin, prominent greenhouse and high H-point seating, the Five Hundred was designed by George Bucher, Chief Designer, under the direction of Ford Vice President of Design, J Mays.

Chassis 
The Ford Five Hundred is based on the Ford D3 platform, shared with the Mercury Montego and Ford Freestyle. An evolution of the Volvo P2 platform (used in the Volvo S80), the platform marked the shift to front-wheel drive in full-size Ford sedans; an electro-hydraulic Haldex all-wheel drive system (based on that used on the Volvo S80 and XC90) was optional in all versions of the Ford Five Hundred or Mercury Montego.

Along with Haldex AWD, several Volvo design features were incorporated into the structure of the Five Hundred, including a modified version of Side Impact Protection System (SIPS) from Volvo, channeling impact forces around the passenger compartment; the front frame rails were redesigned to better absorb impact forces. Alongside standard dual front airbags, the Five Hundred was available with both side airbags and curtain airbags as an option.

For the first time in a full-size Ford sedan, the Ford Five Hundred featured independent suspension for both front and rear axles, with MacPherson strut front suspension and a multi-link rear axle with coilover shocks; both axles were fitted with stabilizer bars. As with the Ford Crown Victoria, the Five Hundred was configured with four-wheel anti-lock disc brakes (12.5-inch front, 13-inch rear).

The Ford Five Hundred/Mercury Montego were powered by a single engine, shared with the Ford Taurus: a 203 hp 3.0L Duratec V6, paired with a 6-speed Aisin automatic transmission (for front-wheel drive versions) or a ZF CVT (for AWD).

Body 
A distinguishing feature of the Ford Five Hundred is its tall exterior height; at 61.5 inches tall, it was over 5 inches taller than the Ford Taurus sold alongside it. A key feature driving the use of the tall body design was the upward movement of the H-point (hip point). As with the first-generation Ford Focus, the seats of the Five Hundred were positioned relatively high from the floor, providing an upright seating position and improved visibility, access, and egress. In addition, the rear seat was positioned higher than the front seats. The Ford Five Hundred was the first full-size Ford sedan to feature a folding rear seat to supplement the 21 cubic foot trunk (larger than the Lincoln Town Car). With the option of a folding front passenger seat, a Five Hundred was able to carry objects up to ten feet long inside the vehicle.

While visibility was one factor behind the higher seating position, safety was another as well. Derived from the Volvo Side Impact Protection System (SIPS), a hydroformed cross-car steel beam underneath the front seats was welded between the B-pillars (directly below an identical beam above the B-pillars).

George Bucher, Ford's chief designer said "it was a challenge to sculpt a Ford-styled body around a Volvo chassis, and added that designers used what he calls plainer surfaces with taut lines to give the car a modern look without losing its passenger-car proportions."

Trim 
Three trim lines were offered: SE, SEL, and Limited. An all wheel drive system was available across the range. Base prices start at US$22,795 for a front-wheel drive SE and range to US$28,495 for an all-wheel drive Limited. Interiors on SEL and Limited trim levels featured a new hydrographic system for applying wood appliqués.

SE - Included: Cloth upholstery, power driver's seat, keyless entry, power accessory delay, power trunk release, power mirrors, power locks, power windows with automatic driver's side window, 17" painted alloy rims, an AM/FM stereo with single-CD player, body color mirrors and handles, and air conditioning.
SEL - Added: heated mirrors, fog lamps, security alarm, automatic headlamps, automatic temp control, message center with compass, an AM/FM stereo with 6-disc in dash CD player with MP3 capability and steering wheel audio controls, power front seats, and an auto-dimming rear view mirror. 
Limited - Added: leather seats, heated seats, memory driver's seat and mirrors, an analog clock, an Audiophile sound system with a subwoofer and an AM/FM stereo with 6-disc in dash CD player and MP3 capability, chrome mirrors, and a trunk cargo net.

Revisions 
During its production run, the Ford Five Hundred saw relatively few changes.

For 2006, a new navigation radio made by Pioneer (featuring Sirius Satellite Radio) became an option; traction control was now changed to an option on front-wheel drive models (from standard). A mid-year running change removed the exterior doorside trim molding on all trim levels in favor of a small sill molding at the bottom edge of the door.

The 2007 Five Hundred remained unchanged, with the SE model discontinued. All versions built after September 4, 2006 have side airbags as standard, along with curtain airbags (marketed as the Safety Canopy). The powertrain warranty was revised to 5 years / . A new Chrome Package became available, with 18-inch eight-spoke alloy wheels and a chrome trim mesh grille.

Discontinuation 

The Five Hundred ended production on April 12, 2007, as did the Mercury Montego and Ford Freestyle. For the 2007 North American International Auto Show, Ford introduced a mid-cycle 2008 update of the Five Hundred and Montego; the new sedans had front and rear fascia styling, new interiors, and new powertrains with a 263 hp 3.5L V6 and a new 6-speed automatic transmission.

Although the changes were positively received, Ford CEO Alan Mulally chose to rename all three D3 platform cars, with the Five Hundred and Montego becoming the fifth-generation Ford Taurus and Mercury Sable; the similarly updated Ford Freestyle continued as the Ford Taurus X. Although the Taurus had been out of retail markets since 2006 (the Sable, since 2005), Mullaly cited the larger brand familiarity of the Taurus/Sable nameplates as the reason for the renaming of the two D3 sedans.

For the 2010 model year, the Ford Taurus underwent a complete redesign. Although retaining the D3 chassis, the exterior and interior was completely changed, to add more aggressive styling. This became the final generation Taurus for North America. As the Mercury brand was being phased out in 2010, 2009 marked the final year of the Sable nameplate.

Sales

Variants 
Alongside the Ford Five Hundred, several versions of the D3 platform were marketed by Ford Motor Company, with all variants produced in the same Chicago assembly facility.

Mercury Montego 

The Mercury division sold the Ford Five Hundred as the Mercury Montego, slotted in between the Grand Marquis and the Milan (replacing the Sable). For the first time since 1979, Mercury sold a completely new full-size car (and two full-size Mercury sedans for the first time since 1974). While largely distinguished from the Five Hundred by its standard HID headlights and LED taillights (the largest set of LED taillights ever introduced on a Ford vehicle at the time), the Montego also differs from the Five Hundred in its monochromatic exterior, satin aluminum trim, and two-tone interior with black-toned wood trim.

As with the Five Hundred, the Montego was produced in front and all-wheel drive configurations, sharing the same powertrains. In contrast, Mercury sold the Montego in two trim levels (Luxury and Premier).

Ford Freestyle 

In its development as one of the vehicles to replace the Ford Taurus, the model lineup of the Five Hundred/Montego was reduced to the four-door sedan exclusively. While not deleted, the role of the Taurus/Sable station wagon would change as it was repackaged as a functionally similar crossover SUV, replacing the long-running third-row jumpseat with a forward-facing folding third row.

Slotted in between the Ford Escape and Ford Explorer in its exterior footprint, the Ford Freestyle was fitted solely with a 3.0-liter V6 engine and a continuously variable transmission (CVT). In its exterior design, the Freestyle borrowed elements from several vehicles, including the Explorer and Escape.

In place of the luxury sedan interior of the Five Hundred/Montego, the Freestyle was designed with a model-specific interior.

While the Freestyle would serve as the basis for the Mercury Meta One concept vehicle, no Mercury version was ever produced beyond the prototype stage.

Reception
During its production, the Ford Five Hundred would attract a high degree of attention by automotive industry critics over its controversial styling. Intended as "guilt-free luxury", several reviewers have noted its close resemblance to Volkswagen and Audi sedans, (along with the lack of brand differentiation between the Ford Five Hundred and Mercury Montego). Others criticized its conservative exterior styling, likely to only appeal to older buyers.

While the Five Hundred would attract attention for its high interior volume, design functionality, value, and large number of safety features, along with its styling, many reviewers criticized the performance of the 3.0L V6 engine and CVT transmission (in comparison to other vehicles).

Ford designer J Mays said "I don't think the Five Hundred or Freestyle was one of my brighter moments in Ford, but designing a car is not a solo effort and a lot of people have input on the kind of product they want. I've been at the company 13 years and I've been through five CEOs. Some of those CEOs have had more conservative tastes than others." Mays later conceded of the Five Hundred's styling: "It's just lacking in the emotional appeal that we should have put into it. We were being good team players, and we did our best to wrap what was a best-in-class package with sheetmetal, and we ended up with a car, I think, that compromised itself in terms of style. But we will never make that mistake again. In fact, we haven't made a mistake like that since we did it. I think of all the cars I've designed in my career, I regret not pushing harder on that car."

References

External links

MyFord500.com- Features news releases, links, photo galleries, and specifications.
2006 Ford Five Hundred

Five Hundred
All-wheel-drive vehicles
Front-wheel-drive vehicles
Ford D3 platform
Sedans
Full-size vehicles
Five Hundred
Cars introduced in 2005
Vehicles with CVT transmission
Motor vehicles manufactured in the United States